Callum David Thorp (born 11 February 1975) is a former professional Australian cricketer who played for Durham County Cricket Club as a right-arm medium bowler. As both of his parents are British, he was able to play for Durham as a non-overseas player. He began his career playing for Western Australia.

References

1975 births
Living people
Australian cricketers
Durham cricketers
Western Australia cricketers
Cricketers from Perth, Western Australia
Australian people of British descent